Greyfriars is the alternate name of a fourteen-story office block built in 1974 in Lewin's Mead in Bristol. It was later used for government offices.

The building takes its name from Greyfriars, a medieval Franciscan friary which historically occupied the site.

Greyfriars was renovated in 2014 and rebranded as Number One Bristol. Two office buildings, Greyfriars and a smaller building nearby on the same block, were converted to a mix of 148 studio, one, two, and three-bedroom apartments and were launched in the spring of 2016.

References

Buildings and structures in Bristol